The Harmony River is a river in Algoma District in northeastern Ontario, Canada that empties into Harmony Bay, part of the larger Batchawana Bay, on Lake Superior at the community of Harmony Beach. The river is known for its rainbow smelt run in the spring and white water kayaking in the early spring and late fall.

See also
List of rivers of Ontario

References

Rivers of Algoma District
Tributaries of Lake Superior